Jan Huberts (12 October 1937 – 19 November 2016) was a Grand Prix motorcycle road racer from the Netherlands. He had his best year in 1962 when he won two Grand Prix races and finished the season in third place behind Ernst Degner and Hans-Georg Anscheidt.

He is holder of the official world speed record for 50cc motorcycles.

Huberts owned and managed a motorcycle racing team. His team contested the 500cc world championship between 1999 and 2001 using Honda NSR500V bikes.

References 

1937 births
2016 deaths
Dutch motorcycle racers
50cc World Championship riders
125cc World Championship riders
250cc World Championship riders
Sportspeople from The Hague
20th-century Dutch people